The Manawatu cricket team represents the Manawatū district of New Zealand. It competes in the Hawke Cup.

History
Cricket was played in the region in the 1870s. The Palmerston Cricket Club was formed in October 1878. The Manawatu Cricket Association was formed in 1895, made up of six clubs: Feilding, Palmerston North, Colyton, Carnarvon, Cheltenham and Birmingham. 

Manawatu played in the very first match in the Hawke Cup, when they defeated Wairarapa in December 1910, thanks largely to the bowling of Arthur Ongley, who took 12 wickets. They have held the Hawke Cup nine times, the first time from February 1928 to March 1930, and most recently from February 2014 to February 2015. They also held the trophy between December 1934 and February 1938, and between January 1940 and April 1947.

Manawatu is one of the eight district associations that make up Central Districts, which competes in the first-class Plunket Shield, the 50-over Ford Trophy and the T20 Super Smash. When Central Districts played their first first-class match in December 1950, they were captained by Manawatu's Joe Ongley.

Senior teams
The clubs that compete at senior level in the Manawatu Cricket Association are Bloomfield, Dannevirke HS, Dannevirke SC, Feilding, Freyberg, Manawatu-Foxton, Marist, Maw Haws, Old Boys, Palmerston, Palmerston North BHS, United and Wanderers.

References 

Cricket teams
Cricket teams in New Zealand
Cricket in Central Districts
Sport in Manawatū-Whanganui
Sports organizations established in 1895